Baeonoma orthozona is a moth of the family Depressariidae. It is found in French Guiana.

The wingspan is 13–14 mm. The forewings are dark fuscous with a small white spot on the base of the dorsum. There is a moderately broad straight white transverse median fascia and a moderate subtriangular white spot on the costa at four-fifths. The hindwings are rather dark grey.

References

Moths described in 1916
Baeonoma
Moths of South America
Taxa named by Edward Meyrick